Apetamin is an appetite stimulating weight-gain supplement manufactured and sold by the Indian pharmaceutical company TIL Healthcare. It is a syrup containing cyproheptadine, the amino acid lysine, and some vitamins. Cyproheptadine, the active ingredient, is an antihistamine and a hepatotoxin that has many effects on the body, including increased appetite, fatigue, and drowsiness. It has not been approved by the US Food and Drug Administration or the UK Medicines and Healthcare products Regulatory Agency. It is illegal to sell apetamin in most countries, including the United States.  It is heavily promoted and illegally sold on social media as a way of achieving the curvy body shape currently fashionable in some communities.

References

Further reading 
 "What to know about Apetamin". Medical News Today
 "Women are using the drug Apetamin to get bigger butts - here are the dangers" News24.com

Appetite stimulants